KwaZulu was a semi-independent bantustan in South Africa, intended by the apartheid government as a homeland for the Zulu people.  The capital was moved from Nongoma to Ulundi in 1980.

It was led until its abolition in 1994 by Chief Mangosuthu Buthelezi and head of Inkatha, who implemented the limited self-governing powers decided by the South African government as part of apartheid, but rejected the nominal independence which four other homelands accepted, complaining about the fragmented nature of the state, and the inability of the apartheid government to consolidate a viable and contiguous territory for KwaZulu, in the face of stiff resistance from whites. F. W. de Klerk later commented in an interview that he believed that Buthelezi would have accepted independence had his homeland been given the port of Richards Bay, a proposal that failed due to the white population's resistance to the idea.

An attempt to transfer parts of the homeland, along with parts of the Swazi homeland KaNgwane, to the neighbouring country of Swaziland (now Eswatini) in 1982 was never realized. This would have given land-locked Swaziland access to the sea. The deal was negotiated by the governments of South Africa and Swaziland, but was met by popular opposition in the territory meant to be transferred. The territory had been claimed by King Sobhuza of Swaziland as part of the Swazi monarchs' traditional realm, and the South African government hoped to use the homeland as a buffer zone against guerrilla infiltration from Mozambique. South Africa responded to the failure of the transfer by temporarily suspending the autonomy of KaNgwane, then restoring it in December 1982 and granting it nominal self-rule in 1984.

KwaZulu was merged with the surrounding South African province of Natal to form the new province of KwaZulu-Natal.

The name kwaZulu translates roughly as Place of Zulus, or more formally Zululand.

In March 1996, two years after South Africa's transition to majority rule, the trial of The State v. Peter Msane & Others was held due to the accusation against thirteen retired white generals, including Magnus Malan (who served as defence minister at the height of emergency rule in the mid-1980s) and seven Zulus, partisans of Buthelezi's Inkatha Freedom Party of complicity in a massacre of thirteen people, ten years earlier, in a rural village in the KwaZulu homeland known as KwaMakhutha. The trial was an attempt by Nelson Mandela's new government to bring to justice those at the top of apartheid's security forces. They were alleged to have purposefully fanned violence among blacks by arming and training one faction as a proxy force, in the tradition of divide and rule. However, all of the defendants were acquitted.

Districts in 1991
Districts of the province and population at the 1991 census. 

 Ezingolweni: 215,224
 Emzumbe: 217,399
 Vulamehlo: 125,179
 Embumbulu: 271,215
 Umlazi: 299,275
 Hlanganani: 186,712
 Ndwedwe: 318,093
 Vulindlela: 223,706
 Empumalanga: 314,440
 Ntuzuma: 458,529
 Kwa Mapumulu: 231,503
 Ongoye: 175,993
 Inkanyezi: 170,628
 Nkandla: 132,578
 Nqutu: 213,636
 Msinga (main town Tugela Ferry): 154,623
 Emnambithi: 205,639
 Enseleni: 241,005
 Hlabisa: 169,719
 Mahlabatini: 141,284
 Nongoma: 169,153
 Ubombo: 113,409
 Ingwavuma: 144,613
 Simdlangentsha: 120,368
 Madadeni: 313,888
 Okhahlamba: 196,963

See also
Chief Ministers of KwaZulu

References

1994 disestablishments in South Africa
Bantustans in South Africa
Geography of KwaZulu-Natal
States and territories established in 1981
1981 establishments in South Africa
States and territories disestablished in 1994
Former republics